Drillia enna, common name the Enna turrid, is a species of sea snail, a marine gastropod mollusk in the family Drilliidae.

Description
The size of the shell varies between 25 mm and 60 mm.

Distribution
This species is found in the demersal zone of tropical waters in the Indo-Pacific. and off the Philippines.

References

  Tucker, J.K. 2004 Catalog of recent and fossil turrids (Mollusca: Gastropoda). Zootaxa 682:1–1295
 Tippett D.L. (2006a) Taxonomic notes on some Indo-Pacific and West African Drillia species (Conoidea: Drillidae). Iberus, 24, 13-21

External links
 Smith, E.A. (1888) Diagnoses of new species of Pleurotomidae in the British Museum. Annals and Magazine of Natural History, series 6, 2, 300–317 
 

enna
Gastropods described in 1918